Masoud Gholami (born 2 April 1991) is an Iranian volleyball player who plays as a middle blocker for the Iranian national team. He was part of national team in the 2015 Asian Championship.

Honours

National team
World Grand Champions Cup
Bronze medal (1): 2017
Asian Championship
Gold medal (1): 2019
Silver medal (1): 2015
Asian Cup
Gold medal (1): 2016

Individual
Best Middle Blocker: 2016 Asian Cup

References

External links

1991 births
Living people
Iranian men's volleyball players
Olympic volleyball players of Iran
Volleyball players at the 2020 Summer Olympics
Middle blockers
People from Kashan